The Ratline: The Exalted Life and Mysterious Death of a Nazi Fugitive is a 2020 book by Philippe Sands that examines Otto Wächter. The book has three "positive" reviews, ten "rave" reviews, and two "mixed" reviews, according to review aggregator Book Marks.

The book has spawned a BBC podcast of the same name.

References

2020 non-fiction books
English-language books
Weidenfeld & Nicolson books